The men's team foil was one of eight fencing events on the fencing at the 1984 Summer Olympics programme. It was the sixteenth appearance of the event. The competition was held from 4 to 5 August 1984. 65 fencers from 14 nations competed.

Rosters

Argentina
 Csaba Gaspar
 Sergio Luchetti
 Marcelo Magnasco
 Sergio Turiace

Austria
 Joachim Wendt
 Dieter Kotlowski
 Georg Somloi
 Robert Blaschka
 Georg Loisel

Belgium
 Thierry Soumagne
 Peter Joos
 Stefan Joos
 Stéphane Ganeff

China
 Chu Shisheng
 Cui Yining
 Yu Yifeng
 Wang Wei
 Zhang Jian
 Liu Yunhong

Egypt
 Ahmed Diab
 Abdel Monem El-Husseini
 Bilal Rifaat
 Khaled Soliman

France
 Frédéric Pietruszka
 Pascal Jolyot
 Patrick Groc
 Philippe Omnès
 Marc Cerboni

Great Britain
 Bill Gosbee
 Pierre Harper
 Nick Bell
 Rob Bruniges
 Graham Paul

Hong Kong
 Ko Yin Fai
 Lai Yee Lap
 Lam Tak Chuen
 Liu Chi On

Italy
 Mauro Numa
 Andrea Borella
 Andrea Cipressa
 Stefano Cerioni
 Angelo Scuri

Japan
 Nobuyuki Azuma
 Yoshihiko Kanatsu
 Hidehachi Koyasu
 Tadashi Shimokawa
 Kenichi Umezawa

Kuwait
 Ahmed Al-Ahmed
 Khaled Al-Awadhi
 Kifah Al-Mutawa
 Mohamed Ghaloum

Lebanon
 Henri Darricau
 Yves Daniel Darricau
 Dany Haddad
 Michel Youssef

United States
 Mike Marx
 Greg Massialas
 Peter Lewison
 Mark Smith
 Mike McCahey

West Germany
 Harald Hein
 Matthias Behr
 Matthias Gey
 Klaus Reichert
 Frank Beck

Results

Round 1

Round 1 Pool A 

The United States and Italy each defeated Egypt, 9–2 and 9–1, respectively. The two victors then faced off. Italy won 9–3.

Round 1 Pool B 

In the first set of matches, West Germany beat Hong Kong 9–1 and Great Britain defeated Japan 8–8 (64–60 on touches). The second set saw the winners both win again (securing advancement) and the loser both lose again (resulting in elimination), as West Germany prevailed over Japan 9–4 and Great Britain won against Hong Kong 9–0. Finally, West Germany took the top spot in the group by beating Great Britain 9–2 while Hong Kong finished last after losing to Japan 9–1.

Round 1 Pool C 

Austria and France each defeated Argentina, 9–4 and 9–2, respectively. The two victors then faced off. France won 9–4.

Round 1 Pool D 

In the first set of matches, Belgium beat Kuwait 9–1 and China defeated Lebanon 9–4. The second set saw the winners both win again (securing advancement) and the loser both lose again (resulting in elimination), as Belgium prevailed over Lebanon 9–0 and China won against Kuwait 9–3. Finally, Belgium took the top spot in the group by beating China 8–8 (60–58 on touches) while Lebanon finished last after forfeiting to Kuwait.

Elimination rounds

References

Foil team
Men's events at the 1984 Summer Olympics